This bibliography covers the English language scholarship of major studies in Chinese history.

Surveys
 
 
 
 Fairbank, John King and Goldman, Merle. China: A New History. 2nd ed. Harvard U. Press, (2006). 640 pp.
 Gernet, Jacques, J. R. Foster, and Charles Hartman. A History of Chinese Civilization (1996). One-volume survey.
 Hsu, Cho-yun. China: A New Cultural History  (Columbia University Press; 2012) 612 pages; stress on China's encounters with successive waves of globalization.
 Hsü, Immanuel Chung-yueh. The Rise of Modern China, 6th ed. (Oxford University Press, 1999). Detailed coverage of 1644–1999, in 1136pp.
 Huang, Ray. China, a Macro History (1997) 335pp. A personal, essayistic approach.
 Keay, John. China: A History (2009), 642pp
 Mote, Frederick W. Imperial China, 900–1800 Harvard University Press, 1999, 1,136 pages. Authoritative treatment of the Song, Yuan, Ming, and Qing dynasties.
 Perkins, Dorothy. Encyclopedia of China: The Essential Reference to China, Its History and Culture. Facts on File, 1999. 662 pp.
 Roberts, J. A. G. A Concise History of China. Harvard U. Press, 1999. 341 pp.
 Schoppa, R. Keith. The Columbia Guide to Modern Chinese History. Columbia U. Press, 2000. 356 pp.
 Spence, Jonathan D. The Search for Modern China (1999), 876pp; survey from 1644 to 1990s
 Wang, Ke-wen, ed. Modern China: An Encyclopedia of History, Culture, and Nationalism. Garland, 1998. 442 pp.
 Wang, David Der-wei. A New Literary History of Modern China (2017)
 Wright, David Curtis. History of China (2001) 257pp.
 Wills, Jr., John E. Mountain of Fame: Portraits in Chinese History (1994) Biographical essays on important figures.

Prehistory
 Chang, Kwang-chih. The Archaeology of Ancient China, Yale University Press, 1986.
 Discovery of residue from fermented beverage consumed up to 9,000 years ago in Jiahu, Henan Province, China. By Dr. Patrick E McGovern, University of Pennsylvania archaeochemist and colleagues from China, Great Britain and Germany.
 
 The Discovery of Early Pottery in China by Zhang Chi, Department of Archaeology, Peking University, China.

Shang dynasty

 Durant, Stephen W. The Cloudy Mirror: Tension and Conflict in the Writings of Sima Qian (1995).

Zhou dynasty

Qin dynasty

Han dynasty

 de Crespigny, Rafe. 1972. The Ch'iang Barbarians and the Empire of Han: A Study in Frontier Policy. Papers on Far Eastern History 16, Australian National University. Canberra.
 de Crespigny, Rafe. 1984. Northern Frontier. The Policies and Strategies of the Later Han Empire. Rafe de Crespigny. 1984. Faculty of Asian Studies, Australian National University. Canberra.
 
 
 Dubs, Homer H. 1938–55. The History of the Former Han Dynasty by Pan Ku.  (3 vol)
 Hill, John E. (2009) Through the Jade Gate to Rome: A Study of the Silk Routes during the Later Han Dynasty, 1st to 2nd centuries CE. .
 Hulsewé, A. F. P. and Loewe, M. A. N., eds. China in Central Asia: The Early Stage 125 B.C. – A.D. 23: an annotated translation of chapters 61 and 96 of the History of the Former Han Dynasty. (1979)
 Twitchett, Denis and Loewe, Michael, eds. 1986. The Cambridge History of China. Volume I. The Ch'in and Han Empires, 221 B.C. – a.d. 220. Cambridge University Press.
 Yap, Joseph P. (2009) Wars With the Xiongnu – A Translation From Zizhi tongjian, AuthorHouse.

Jin, the Sixteen Kingdoms, and the Northern and Southern dynasties

Sui dynasty

 Wright, Arthur F. 1978. The Sui Dynasty. Alfred A. Knopf, New York. ,  (pbk).

Tang dynasty

 Benn, Charles. 2002. China's Golden Age: Everyday Life in the Tang Dynasty. Oxford University Press. .
 Lewis, Mark Edward. 2012. China's Cosmopolitan Empire: The Tang Dynasty (2012).  excerpt; A standard scholarly survey.
 Schafer, Edward H. 1967. The Vermilion Bird: T'ang Images of the South. University of California Press, Berkeley and Los Angeles. Reprint 1985. .
 Wang, Zhenping. 1991. "T'ang Maritime Trade Administration." Wang Zhenping. Asia Major, Third Series, Vol. IV, 1991, pp. 7–38.

Liao dynasty

 Standen, Naomi. 2004. Unbounded loyalty: Frontier crossing in Liao China. University of Hawaii Press. .

Song dynasty

 Chaffee, John W. and Denis Twitchett, eds. Cambridge History of China, Vol. 5 Part 2 The Five Dynasties and Sung China, 960-1279 AD (2015).
 Ebrey, Patricia. The Inner Quarters: Marriage and the Lives of Chinese Women in the Sung Period (1990)
 
 Hymes, Robert, and Conrad Schirokauer, eds. Ordering the World: Approaches to State and Society in Sung Dynasty China, U of California Press, 1993; complete text online free
 
 Shiba, Yoshinobu. 1970. Commerce and Society in Sung China. Originally published in Japanese as So-dai sho-gyo—shi kenkyu-. Tokyo, Kazama shobo-, 1968. Yoshinobu Shiba. Translation by Mark Elvin, Centre for Chinese Studies, University of Michigan.

Yuan dynasty

Ming dynasty

 Brook, Timothy. The Confusions of Pleasure: Commerce and Culture in Ming China. (1998).
  329 pages. Focus on the impact of a Little Ice Age on the empire, as the empire, beginning with a sharp drop in temperatures in the 13th century during which time the Mongol leader Kubla Khan moved south into China.
 Dardess, John W.  A Ming Society: T'ai-ho County, Kiangsi, Fourteenth to Seventeenth Centuries. (1983); uses advanced "new social history" complete text online free
 Farmer, Edward.  Zhu Yuanzhang and Early Ming Legislation: The Reordering of Chinese Society Following the Era of Mongol Rule.  E.J. Brill, 1995.
 Goodrich, L. Carrington, and Chaoying Fang.  Dictionary of Ming Biography. (1976).
 Huang, Ray. 1587, A Year of No Significance: The Ming Dynasty in Decline. (1981).
 Mote, Frederick W., and Denis Twitchett, eds. The Cambridge History of China. Vol. 7, part 1: The Ming Dynasty, 1368–1644 (1988). 1008 pp. excerpt and text search
 ——The Cambridge History of China. Vol. 8: The Ming Dynasty, 1368–1644, Part 2.  (1998). 1203 pp.
 Schneewind, Sarah. A Tale of Two Melons: Emperor and Subject in Ming China. (2006).
 Tsai, Shih-shan Henry. Perpetual Happiness: The Ming Emperor Yongle.  (2001).

Qing dynasty

 Arthur W. Hummel. Eminent Chinese of the Ch'ing Period (1644–1912). (Washington: Library of Congress. Orientalia, Division; U.S. Government  Printing Office,  1943). 2 vols. Reprinted: Berkshire, 2016. 800 still generally reliable biographical articles, a number of which are online: Qing Research Portal.
 Fairbank, John K. and Liu, Kwang-Ching, ed. The Cambridge History of China. Vol. 2: Late Ch'ing, 1800–1911, Part 2. Cambridge U. Press, 1980. 754 pp.
 Mann, Susan. Precious Records: Women in China's Long Eighteenth Century (1997)
  Naquin, Susan, and Evelyn S. Rawski. Chinese Society in the Eighteenth Century (1989)  excerpt and text search
 Peterson, Willard J., ed. The Cambridge History of China. Vol. 9, Part 1: The Ch'ing Dynasty to 1800. Cambridge U. Press, 2002. 753 pp.
 Rawski, Evelyn S. The Last Emperors: A Social History of Qing Imperial Institutions (2001)
 
 
 Struve, Lynn A., ed.  The Qing Formation in World-Historical Time.  (2004). 412 pp.
 Struve, Lynn A., ed.  Voices from the Ming-Qing Cataclysm: China in Tigers' Jaws (1998)

Nationalist era (1912–present)

 Bergere, Marie-Claire. Sun Yat-Sen (1998), 480pp. Standard biography
 Boorman, Howard L., et al., eds. Biographical Dictionary of Republican China. (Vol. I-IV and Index. 1967–1979). 600 short scholarly biographies excerpt and text search. Online at Internet Archive.
 Dreyer, Edward L.  China at War, 1901–1949. (1995). 422 pp.
 Eastman Lloyd. Seeds of Destruction: Nationalist China in War and Revolution, 1937– 1945. (1984)
 Eastman Lloyd et al. The Nationalist Era in China, 1927–1949 (1991)
 Ebrey, Patricia (1996), "Surnames and Han Chinese Identity", in Melissa J. Brown, Negotiating Ethnicities in China and Taiwan, Berkeley, CA: University of California Press, .
 Edmondson, Robert (2002), "The February 28 Incident and National Identity", in Stephane Corcuff, Momories of the Future:National Identity Issues and the Search for a New Taiwan, New York: M.E. Sharpe.
 Fairbank, John K., ed. The Cambridge History of China, Vol. 12, Republican China 1912–1949. Part 1. (1983). 1001 pp.
 --- and Feuerwerker, Albert, eds.  The Cambridge History of China. Vol. 13: Republican China, 1912–1949, Part 2. (1986). 1092 pp.
 Fogel, Joshua A. The Nanjing Massacre in History and Historiography (2000)
 Gordon, David M. "The China-Japan War, 1931–1945,"  The Journal of Military History v70#1 (2006) 137–182. Overview of important books and interpretations; online
 Hsiung, James C. and Steven I. Levine, eds. China's Bitter Victory: The War with Japan, 1937–1945 (1992). Survey essays.
 Hsi-sheng, Ch'i. Nationalist China at War: Military Defeats and Political Collapse, 1937–1945 (1982)
 Mitter, Rana. Forgotten Ally: China's World War II, 1937–1945. (Boston: Houghton Mifflin Harcourt,  2013).   .
 Manthorpe, Jonathan (2008), Forbidden Nation: A History of Taiwan, Palgrave Macmillan.
 Mitter, Rana. A Bitter Revolution : China's Struggle with the Modern World. (Oxford; New York: Oxford University Press,  2004).   .
 Hung, Chang-tai. War and Popular Culture: Resistance in Modern China, 1937–1945 (1994) complete text online free
 Lary, Diana. The Chinese People at War: Human Suffering and Social Transformation, 1937–1945 (2010)
 James E. Sheridan, China in Disintegration: The Republican Era in Chinese History, 1912-1949 (New York: Free Press; The Transformation of Modern China Series, 1975)

 Shiroyama, Tomoko. China during the Great Depression: Market, State, and the World Economy, 1929–1937 (2008).
 Shuyun, Sun. The Long March: The True History of Communist China's Founding Myth (2007)
 Taylor, Jay. The Generalissimo: Chiang Kai-shek and the Struggle for Modern China. (2009) 
 Westad, Odd Arne. Decisive Encounters: The Chinese Civil War, 1946–1950. (2003). 413 pp. A standard history.

Communist era (1949–present)
  Barnouin, Barbara, and Yu Changgen. Zhou Enlai: A Political Life (2005)
 Chang, Jung and Jon Halliday. Mao: The Unknown Story, (2005), 814 pages, 
 
 Dikötter, Frank. The Tragedy of Liberation: A History of the Chinese Revolution, 1945–57. (New York: Bloomsbury Press,  2013).   .
 Dikötter, Frank. Mao's Great Famine: The History of China's Most Devastating Catastrophe, 1958–62. (London: Bloomsbury,  2010).   .
 Dittmer, Lowell. China's Continuous Revolution: The Post-Liberation Epoch, 1949–1981 (1989)  online free.
 Garver, John W. China's Quest: The History of the Foreign Relations of the People's Republic (2nd ed. 2016)
  Both sympathetic and critical.
 Kirby, William C.; Ross, Robert S.; and Gong, Li, eds.  Normalization of U.S.-China Relations: An International History. (2005). 376 pp.
  Li, Xiaobing. A History of the Modern Chinese Army (2007)
  MacFarquhar, Roderick and Fairbank, John K., eds.  The Cambridge History of China. Vol. 15: The People's Republic, Part 2: Revolutions within the Chinese Revolution, 1966–1982. Cambridge U. Press, 1992. 1108 pp.
 Meisner, Maurice. Mao's China and After: A History of the People's Republic, 3rd ed. (Free Press, 1999), dense book with theoretical and political science approach.
 Pantsov, Alexander and Steven I. Levine. Deng Xiaoping : A Revolutionary Life. Oxford University Press,  2015).   .
 Pantsov, Alexander, With Steven I Levine. Mao: The Real Story. (New York: Simon & Schuster,  2012).   .
 Ross, John. China's Great Road: Lessons for Marxist Theory and Socialist Practices. (Praxis Press, 2021) .
 Spence, Jonathan. Mao Zedong (1999)
 Walder, Andrew G.  China under Mao: A Revolution Derailed (Harvard University Press, 2015) 413 pp. online review
 Wang, Jing. High Culture Fever: Politics, Aesthetics, and Ideology in Deng's China (1996)  complete text online free

Cultural Revolution, 1966–76
 Clark, Paul. The Chinese Cultural Revolution: A History (2008), a favorable look at artistic production  excerpt and text search
 Esherick, Joseph W.; Pickowicz, Paul G.; and Walder, Andrew G., eds.  The Chinese Cultural Revolution as History. (2006). 382 pp.
 Jian, Guo; Song, Yongyi; and Zhou, Yuan. Historical Dictionary of the Chinese Cultural Revolution. (2006). 433 pp.
 Richard Curt Kraus. The Cultural Revolution: A Very Short Introduction. (New York: Oxford University Press, Very Short Introductions Series,  2012).   .
  MacFarquhar, Roderick and Fairbank, John K., eds.  The Cambridge History of China. Vol. 15: The People's Republic, Part 2: Revolutions within the Chinese Revolution, 1966–1982. Cambridge U. Press, 1992. 1108 pp.
 MacFarquhar, Roderick and Michael Schoenhals. Mao's Last Revolution. (2006).
 MacFarquhar, Roderick. The Origins of the Cultural Revolution. Vol. 3: The Coming of the Cataclysm, 1961–1966. (1998). 733 pp.
 Yan, Jiaqi and Gao, Gao. Turbulent Decade: A History of the Cultural Revolution. (1996). 736 pp.

Economy and environment
 Benn, James A. Tea in China: A Religious and Cultural History (2015)
 Chaffee, John W. The Muslim Merchants of Premodern China: The History of a Maritime Asian Trade Diaspora, 750-1400 (2018)
  Chao, Kang. Man and Land in Chinese History: An Economic Analysis (Stanford UP, 1986)
 Chow, Gregory C. China's Economic Transformation (2nd ed. 2007)
 Elvin, Mark.  Retreat of the Elephants: An Environmental History of China. (2004). 564 pp.
 Elvin, Mark and Liu, Ts'ui-jung, eds.  Sediments of Time: Environment and Society in Chinese History. (1998). 820 pp.
 von Glahn, Richard. The Economic History of China: From Antiquity to the Nineteenth Century (Cambridge UP, 2016). 461 pp. online review
 Ji, Zhaojin.  A History of Modern Shanghai Banking: The Rise and Decline of China's Finance Capitalism. (2003. 325) pp.
  Naughton, Barry. The Chinese Economy: Transitions and Growth (2007)
 Rawski, Thomas G. and Lillian M. Li, eds. Chinese History in Economic Perspective, University of California Press, 1992 complete text online free
 Sheehan, Jackie.  Chinese Workers: A New History. Routledge, 1998. 269 pp.
  Stuart-Fox, Martin.  A Short History of China and Southeast Asia: Tribute, Trade and Influence. (2003). 278 pp.
 Von Glahn, Richard. The Economic History of China: "From Antiquity to the 19th Century (2016)  excerpt

Atlases
 Stanford, Edward. Atlas of the Chinese Empire, containing separate maps of the eighteen provinces of China (2nd ed 1917) Legible color maps Online free

Women and gender
 Ebrey, Patricia. The Inner Quarters: Marriage and the Lives of Chinese Women in the Sung Period (1990)
 Hershatter, Gail, and Wang Zheng. "Chinese History: A Useful Category of Gender Analysis," American Historical Review, Dec 2008, Vol. 113 Issue 5, pp 1404–1421
 Hershatter, Gail. Women in China's Long Twentieth Century (2007), full text online
 Hershatter, Gail, Emily Honig, Susan Mann, and Lisa Rofel, eds. Guide to Women's Studies in China (1998)
 Ko, Dorothy. Teachers of Inner Chambers: Women and Culture in China, 1573–1722 (1994)
 Mann, Susan. Precious Records: Women in China's Long Eighteenth Century (1997)
 Wang, Shuo. "The 'New Social History' in China: The Development of Women's History," History Teacher, May 2006, Vol. 39 Issue 3, pp 315–323
 Yan, Chen, and Karen Offen. "Women's History at the Cutting Edge: a joint paper in two voices." Women's History Review 27.1 (2018): 6-28.

Bibliography
 Hayford, Charles. China: World Bibliographical Series (ABC-CLIO, 1997), annotates over 1500 works and refers to more than 2000 others, covering all fields and disciplines. Online at Internet Archive, HERE 
 Elman, Benjamin, Classical Historiography For Chinese History, (November 2015) Princeton University. Extensive lists of sinological resources and bibliography.
 Wilkinson, Endymion, Chinese History: A New Manual Fifth Edition, Harvard University, Asia Center (for the Harvard-Yenching Institute), 2018, . Supersedes Wilkinson (2015). Though aimed at research specialists, contains summaries of major topics that will be useful for general readers.

Historiography
 Clark, Hugh R. "What's the Matter with “China”? A Critique of Teleological History." Journal of Asian Studies 77.2 (2018): 295-314.
 Chen, Yan and Karen Offen. "Women's History at the Cutting Edge: a joint paper in two voices." Women's History Review 27.1 (2018): 6-28.
 Cohen, Paul A., Discovering History in China: American Historical Writing on the Recent Chinese Past (1984; New York: Columbia University Press; Studies of the East Asian Institute, 2010)

 Ding, Yizhuang. "Reflections on the 'New Qing History' School in the United States," Chinese Studies in History, Winter 2009/2010, Vol. 43 Issue 2, pp 92–96.

 Jin, Yan. "Shanghai Studies: An evolving academic field." History Compass 16.11 (2018): e12496.
 Li, Huaiyin. Reinventing Modern China: Imagination and Authenticity in Chinese Historical Writing (Honolulu, 2012)
 Mann, Susan. Gender and Sexuality in Modern Chinese History (New York: Cambridge University Press; New Approaches to Asian History, 2011)

 Mitter, Rana. "Research Note Changed by War: The Changing Historiography Of Wartime China and New Interpretations Of Modern Chinese History." The Chinese Historical Review 17.1 (2010): 85-95.
 Schneider, Julia C. Nation and Ethnicity: Chinese Discussions on History, Historiography, and Nationalism (1900s-1920s) (Brill, 2017) 501 pp.
 Smith, S. A. "China, Revolution and Presentism." Past & Present 234.1 (2017): 274-289.
 Szonyi, Michael. A Companion to Chinese History (Hoboken, NJ: John Wiley & Sons, 2016). Review-of-the-field articles on periods and topics. 

 Taylor, Jeremy E., and Grace C. Huang. "'Deep changes in interpretive currents'? Chiang Kai-shek studies in the post-cold war era." International Journal of Asian Studies 9.1 (2012): 99-121.
 Unger, Jonathan. Using the Past to Serve the Present: Historiography and Politics in Contemporary China (1993)
 Wilkinson, Endymion Porter.  Chinese History: A New Manual (Cambridge, MA: Harvard University Asia Center, 2018). Annotated chapters on all aspects of Chinese history and culture up to 1911, including "boxes" that focus on topics of particular interest.

 Wu, Huaiqi and Chi Zhen, eds. An Historical Sketch of Chinese Historiography (2018).
 Zhang, Xupeng. "In and out of the west: On the past, present, and future of chinese historical theory." History and Theory 54.4 (2015): 46-63. 
 Zurndorfer, Harriet. "Oceans of history, seas of change: recent revisionist writing in western languages about China and East Asian maritime history during the period 1500–1630." International Journal of Asian Studies 13.1 (2016): 61-94.

Scholarly journals
 Central Asian Survey
 China Quarterly
 Chinese Studies in History
 East Asian History
 Early Medieval China. Covers the period between the end of the Han and beginning of the Tang.
 Journal of Asian Studies.
 Journal of Modern Chinese History
 Late Imperial China
 Modern China: An International Journal of History and Social Science
 Sino-Japanese Studies
 T'oung Pao: International Journal of Chinese Studies

Bibliographies of history
Historiography of China